Persoonia laxa is a rare, probably extinct, shrub native to the Sydney region in eastern Australia.

Persoonia laxa grew as a spreading or prostrate shrub with smooth bark. The flat leaves were 8–15 mm long and 1–1.8 mm wide and linear in shape. The leaf margins were recurved. The new growth is covered in sparse hairs. P. laxa is described as auxotelic, which means each stalk bears an individual flower that is subtended by a leaf at its junction with the stem. Known as pedicels, these smooth and measure 6–8 mm in length. The flowers occur in groups of one to three. Each individual flower consists of a cylindrical perianth, consisting of tepals fused for most of their length, within which are both male and female parts. The central style is surrounded by the anther, which splits into four segments; these curl back and resemble a cross when viewed from above.

Two specimens were collected in what are now Sydney's Northern Beaches—one from Newport in November 1907 and the other from Manly in June 1908.  The genus was reviewed by Peter Weston for the Flora of Australia treatment in 1995, and P. laxa was placed in the Lanceolata group, a group of 54 closely related species with similar flowers but very different foliage. These species will often interbreed with each other where two members of the group occur, A third specimen, collected in 1922 from Dee Why, appears to be intermediate between (and is possibly a hybrid of) P. laxa and P. levis.

Because of limited observation and its disappearance and presumed extinction, little is known about its flowering and fruit.

Occurring in Newport and Manly in central-eastern N.S.W, P. laxa was thought to have been a component of heath or dry sclerophyll eucalypt woodland or forest on sandstone soils, or possibly in sandy soils on the coast. P. laxa grew at an altitude of 0–20 m with an annual rainfall of 1200–1400 mm.

Persoonia laxa is listed nationally as extinct under the Australian Environment Protection and Biodiversity Conservation Act 1999 (EPBC Act). The reasons are unknown, though the area in which it was found has become very urbanised.

References

Flora of New South Wales
laxa
Plants described in 1991